Lacrymospora is a genus of fungi in the family Pyrenulaceae. It is a monotypic genus, containing the single species Lacrymospora parasitica.

References

External links
 Lacrymospora at Index Fungorum

Pyrenulales
Lichenicolous fungi
Monotypic Eurotiomycetes genera
Taxa named by André Aptroot
Taxa described in 1991